The Llao Llao Hotel is located in the tourist resort of San Carlos de Bariloche within the Río Negro, Argentina.
This famous hotel is situated in the foothills of the Andes on a hill between the Moreno Lake and Nahuel Huapi lakes.

Information
The original hotel, designed by Alejandro Bustillo, was made almost entirely of wood and furnished by Jean-Michel Frank and Casa Comte, was destroyed by fire soon after its completion in 1939.  A year later Bustillo built a new hotel out of reinforced concrete and stone, with the assistance of the German landscaping architect Hermann Botrich. It closed in 1976 due to lack of funds for maintenance. While it was closed, the hotel was exposed to robbery, vandalism and overall neglect.

It was renovated and reopened in 1993 after ownership was transferred to CEI Citicorp Holdings in compensation for Argentina government bonds. The Argentinian property company IRSA acquired the hotel in 1997 for $13.3 million and later sold 50% of its stake to the Sutton Group. In 1999 the hotel became a member of The Leading Hotels of the World, and has won many important prizes since its re-opening, including "The Best Hotel and Resort in the Argentine Hinterland" in 1999.

The hotel is the site of the annual classical music festival, Semana Musical Llao Llao.

See also 
 San Carlos de Bariloche
 Nahuel Huapi National Park

References

 Traveler magazine, Third Argentine Pol, San Marco Editora (Publishers), 1999
Alberto Bellucci, The Bariloche Style, J. Decorative & Propaganda Arts, Argentine Theme Issue, 1992. El Portal de arte y arquitectura en Internet

External links 

 Official Site

Hotel buildings completed in 1940
Tourism in Argentina
Hotels in Argentina
Buildings and structures in Río Negro Province
Tourist attractions in Río Negro Province
Bariloche